Through The Eyes Of Heathens is Dozer's fourth album. It was recorded at the Seawolf Studios in Helsinki. The album was released on Small Stone Records with whom they had signed on to earlier that year. The album includes the track Until Man Exists No More which features guest vocals by Troy Sanders of Mastodon.

Track listing

"Drawing Dead" - 4:38
"Born a Legend" - 3:24
"From Fire Fell" - 2:39
"Until Man Exists No More" - 5:08
"Days of Future Past" - 3:45
"Omega Glory" - 5:00
"Blood Undone" - 4:44
"The Roof, The River, The Revolver" - 3:07
"Man of Fire" - 3:16
"Big Sky Theory" - 8:28

References

Dozer albums
2006 albums